Leioproctus fulvescens is a species of solitary bee belonging to the family Colletidae. This bee is endemic to the South Island of New Zealand, and its yellow-orange hair distinguishes it from all other New Zealand species of Leioproctus.

Name 
The native solitary bees of pre-European New Zealand were collectively known by the Māori name ,  being the generic word for wasp, bee, or large fly, and  the adjective for hairy or furry.

Taxonomy 
Leioproctus fulvescens was first formally described as Lamprocolletes fulvescens in 1876 by the English entomologist Frederick Smith. The types had been collected in the region of Canterbury by Charles Marcus Wakefield, son of Daniel Wakefield. This species is classified in the subgenus Nesocolletes of the large Australasian and temperate South American genus Leioproctus within the family Colletidae.

Description 

Behaviour 
Leioproctus fulvescens adults fly primarily in the spring and summer, with the majority of individuals being observed between November to March, though some have been observed as early as September. The bees nest underground in a variety of soil types, including beach sand, salt flats, dry river banks, clay, garden soil, and compacted dirt and shingle roads; nearly any soil type appears to be used so long as it is on relatively free of vegetation, has a relatively low level of moisture and a sunny aspect. Females prefer to build their nest tunnels in slightly sloping ground, and dig the main shaft anywhere from  into the ground. Along the tunnel, there are often a number of side branches, each terminating in a single oval nesting chamber. The chamber is lined with a cellophane-like substance which reduces the amount of moisture that can enter the cell, providing a protective chamber for the larvae to develop. Each chamber is provisioned with a ball of pollen and nectar, on top of which a single egg is laid. Once completed, the chamber is sealed up with packed earth.

Food plants 
Leioproctus fulvescens females forage on plants from several genera including as Raoulia, Olearia and Celmisia, as well as species such as Gentiana corymbifera (snow gentian) and some of the white flowered hebes such as Hebe subalpina. They have also been observed foraging on introduced asters, such as yarrow and Canada thistle.

Bug of the Year 2023 
Leioproctus fulvescens was awarded the title New Zealand Bug of the Year by the Entomological Society of New Zealand on 14 February 2023 after it gained the most votes in the inaugural Bug of the Year competition.

References

External links 

 Leioproctus fulvescens discussed on RNZ Critter of the Week, 15 December 2017 and 17 February 2023

Colletidae
Hymenoptera of New Zealand
Insects described in 1876
Endemic fauna of New Zealand